Mount Pleasant Cemetery is an historic cemetery at Crocker, Cohannet, and Barnum Streets in Taunton, Massachusetts.  Opened in 1836, but based on a family burial ground dating to the early 18th century, it is the fourth garden cemetery in the U.S. rural cemeteries, based on the early Victorian model of Mount Auburn Cemetery in Cambridge, Massachusetts.  The cemetery was listed on the National Register of Historic Places in 2002.

History
Mount Pleasant Cemetery was established in the grounds of the King family homestead, which included burials dating to 1710; these graves are still located in the cemetery. The cemetery was designed by Easton native Joseph Wilbar, who had moved to Taunton in 1822; it appears to be the only known landscape work he has executed.

Mount Pleasant Cemetery officially on July 4, 1836 as the third "garden style" cemetery in the country. The Mount Auburn Cemetery in Cambridge, Massachusetts was the first.

There are soldiers buried in this cemetery from the King William's War, Queen Anne's War, American Revolutionary War, War of 1812, Mexican War, American Civil War, Spanish–American War, World War I, World War II and the Korean War. The highest ranking army officer in this cemetery is Civil War General Darius Nash Couch and the highest ranking Naval officer is Rear Admiral Albert Loring Swasey. There are Congressmen, state legislators, mayors as well as national pioneers in the fields of industry, business, the arts and transportation.

Notable burials
Darius N. Couch
Samuel L. Crocker
William Mason
Marcus Morton (1784–1864)
Marcus Morton (1819–1891)
Charles Swasey

See also
National Register of Historic Places listings in Taunton, Massachusetts

References

National Register of Historic Places in Taunton, Massachusetts
Cemeteries on the National Register of Historic Places in Massachusetts
Buildings and structures in Taunton, Massachusetts
Cemeteries in Bristol County, Massachusetts
Rural cemeteries
Cemeteries established in the 17th century
1710 establishments in Massachusetts